LeapFrog Investments is a private investment firm that invests in high-growth financial services and healthcare companies in emerging markets. Since inception, LeapFrog has attracted over $2 billion USD from global investors. The firm's investments have an annual growth rate of more than 26% and its companies reach approximately 407 million consumers, primarily in Africa and Asia.

Details
LeapFrog was founded in January 2007 by Andrew Kuper and officially launched in 2008 by former US President Bill Clinton who endorsed the firm for opening new frontiers for alternative investments.

According to The Economist, LeapFrog is a well-established impact investing firm. LeapFrog has attracted over $2 billion USD from global investors, including Temasek, Prudential Financial, Swiss Re, JP Morgan, TIAA-CREF and eBay founder Pierre Omidyar's Omidyar Network. The firm has invested in companies such as BIMA, a financial technology business that provides services including mobile insurance to 37 million low income customers in Asia, Africa and Latin America, and India's Mahindra Insurance Brokers, a leading Indian insurance broker and part of Mahindra Group. LeapFrog expanded its reach into healthcare in 2016, investing in companies including Kenyan retail pharmacy chain Goodlife

LeapFrog owns significant stakes in companies in Ghana, Kenya, Nigeria, South Africa, Thailand, Indonesia, Sri Lanka and India. It raised its first fund of $135 million in 2009 to invest in insurance and related financial services companies. In September 2013, LeapFrog Investments launched its second fund, raising $204 million USD initially, and in 2014 it announced the fund was oversubscribed at $400 million USD. Overseas Private Investment Corporation (OPIC), the U.S. government’s development finance institution, committed to invest up to $200 million USD in December 2015, the largest investment commitment historically by OPIC to any impact fund manager. In January 2016, Prudential Financial invested $350 million USD with the firm.

LeapFrog consulted on the creation of the Operating Principles for Impact Management in Partnership with the IFC and World Bank in 2018. The nine principles were created to set a basic market standard for impact investing and serve as a guide to deployment of capital by institutional investors. In 2019, LeapFrog became the first impact investor globally to announce the results of an independent audit of its impact against the Operating Principles for Impact Management. LeapFrog was deemed an "exemplification of industry best practice" with its impact measurement and management systems assessed as reaching "an advanced level of alignment across the board for all nine of the Principles". 

In 2018, LeapFrog formed its Global Leadership Council. Members include Julia Gillard , former Prime Minister of Australia; Henri de Castries, former chairman and CEO of AXA; Simon Israel, former Chairman of Singtel; Jaime Augusto Zobel de Ayala, chairman and CEO of Ayala Corporation; Bharat Doshi, former Director of the Reserve Bank of India; David Gonski, former Chairman of ANZ Banking Group; and Roger Ferguson, Former President and CEO of TIAA and former Vice Chair of the US Federal Reserve. 

In 2019, LeapFrog raised $700 million USD for its third emerging markets fund. It used the funds to invest in companies including WorldRemit and MedGenome. The fund launched with 40 institutional investors including Prudential Financial, OPIC and International Finance Corporation.

In March 2021, Temasek, an investment company headquartered in Singapore, entered into a $500 million USD strategic partnership with LeapFrog. The multi-fund investment by Temasek anchors LeapFrog's future funds and provides growth capital to support the expansion of the LeapFrog team and investment capabilities across Asia and Africa. 

LeapFrog has offices in Mauritius, Singapore, South Africa, Australia, Nairobi, Lagos and the United Kingdom. In 2017, Fortune ranked LeapFrog Investments as one of the top 5 Companies to Change the World, alongside Apple and Novartis.

See also
Impact investing
Private equity
Emerging markets
Blue Haven Initiative

References

Alternative investment management companies
Private equity firms
Companies of Mauritius
Social impact
Financial services companies established in 2007